Limnomedusae is an order of hydrozoans.

Taxonomy
The taxon was erected by Danish marine biologist Paul Lassenius Kramp in 1938 to accommodate certain families of hydrozoans with biphasic life histories. It includes genera with medusae with ecto-endodermal statocysts and with gonads alongside their radial canals, and also genera which have polyps that are not covered by a theca. Molecular analysis performed by Collins in 2006 has since shown that the Limnomedusae are not monophylic. The family Armorhydridae, which contains a single genus and a single species, Armorhydra janowiczi, is found living in coarse sediment, has hollow tentacles and has no radial canals. It seems to share few morphological features with the other families and probably belongs elsewhere. The inclusion of Microhydrulidae is also dubious. The medusa stage is not known and the tiny polyp has no tentacles nor mouth.

Systematic list
The World Register of Marine Species currently lists the following families and genera:

Family Armorhydridae Swedmark & Teissier, 1958
Genus Armorhydra Swedmark & Teissier, 1958
Family Microhydrulidae Bouillon & Deroux, 1967
Genus Microhydrula Valkanov, 1965
Genus Rhaptapagis Bouillon & Deroux, 1967
Family Monobrachiidae Mereschkowsky, 1877
Genus Monobrachium Mereschkowsky, 1877
Family Olindiidae Haeckel, 1879
Genus Aglauropsis Mueller, 1865
Genus Astrohydra Hashimoto, 1981
Genus Calpasoma Fuhrmann, 1939
Genus Craspedacusta Lankester, 1880
Genus Cubaia Mayer, 1894
Genus Eperetmus Bigelow, 1915
Genus Gonionemus A. Agassiz, 1862
Genus Gossea L. Agassiz, 1862
Genus Hexaphilia Gershwin & Zeidler, 2003
Genus Limnocnida Günther, 1893
Genus Maeotias Ostroumoff, 1896
Genus Nuarchus Bigelow, 1912
Genus Olindias Mueller, 1861
Genus Scolionema Kishinouye, 1910
Genus Vallentinia Browne, 1902

References

 
Trachylinae
Cnidarian orders